Joshua Perper (December 17, 1932 – July 12, 2021) was a noted forensic pathologist and toxicologist. He served as the Chief Medical Examiner of Broward County, Florida for seventeen years, during which time he conducted autopsies on a number of famous individuals, including Anna Nicole Smith. Prior to his appointment to that position, he served as Allegheny County's Coroner serving metro Pittsburgh.

Early life and professional career
Perper was born in Bacău, Romania. Being Jewish, he escaped the Nazis during World War II and, following the war, the Russians. At the age of 18, he moved to Israel, graduating from the Hebrew University of Jerusalem Faculty of Medicine (medical school) in 1960 and Faculty of Law (law school) in 1966. In 1969, he finished post graduate studies in forensic pathology at Johns Hopkins University. He served as Associate Medical Examiner, Senior Research Fellow and then Chief Medical Examiner in Baltimore, Maryland from 1969 to 1971. Between 1971 and 1994, while living in Pittsburgh, Pennsylvania, Perper was a toxicologist and then Chief Forensic Pathologist in the Allegheny County Coroner's Office (now called the Medical Examiner's Office), serving under Cyril Wecht.

Allegheny County Coroner
In 1980, Wecht was elected to the Allegheny County Board of Commissioners. Wecht did not resign as Coroner until January 9, two days after his swearing-in as Commissioner, as the law did not prohibit him from holding both the offices of Coroner and Commissioner. He resigned under pressure from a variety of sources, including his predecessor as coroner, Ralph Stalter, a Republican, and the administration of Governor Dick Thornburgh, also a Republican. Wecht initially recommended that Perper succeed him, and indeed Perper held the title of Acting Coroner until Thornburgh appointed Sanford Edburg to succeed Wecht. While Perper initially rejected the appointment as unconstitutional, the State Supreme Court upheld Thornburgh's right to appoint Edberg, who duly took over the office of Coroner on March 2, 1981. The transition was not met without a brief physical altercation between the two men. Perper would return to the Coroner's office in January 1982, after he defeated Edberg in the fall 1981 general election.

Los Angeles County Medical Examiner appointment
In February 1991, the Los Angeles County Board of Supervisors voted unanimously to name Perper the County's new Chief Medical Examiner. While Perper initially accepted the posting, he backed-out of the job two months before he was to begin his duties. Perper cited a variety of reasons behind his decision, including the economic–media reports which indicated Perper and his wife, a real estate agent, believed they could not afford the kind of home to which they had become accustomed—and the emotional—Perper's wife also did not want to leave behind the couple's friends.

He would therefore remain Allegheny County Coroner for another three years.

Broward County Chief Medical Examiner
Perper did resign as Allegheny County Coroner in 1994, after he was appointed Chief Medical Examiner of Broward County, Florida by Governor Lawton Chiles.

Notable autopsies

Krissy Taylor
Perper performed the autopsy on Krissy Taylor, the 17-year-old model who died of bronchial asthma in 1995, after collapsing in her parents' home. Krissy was the younger sister of model Niki Taylor.

Steve Bechler
Perper performed the autopsy of Steve Bechler after the pitcher's death on February 17, 2003.  According to Perper:
"It is my professional opinion that the toxicity of ephedra played a significant role in the death of Mr. Bechler, although it's impossible to define mathematically the contribution of each one of the factors in his unfortunate death due to heatstroke."

During the investigation Perper interviewed Bechler's family.  He found that Bechler was overweight, out of shape, was not yet accustomed to the warm and humid weather in South Florida, was on a primarily liquid or semi-liquid diet, did not feel well or eat the night before he collapsed and had high blood pressure, was using Xenadrine and had abnormal liver functions.

Anna Nicole Smith
Perper oversaw as Gertrude M. Juste and Stephen Cina examined and autopsied the body of Anna Nicole Smith in 2007. He also had significant involvement in the hearing deciding the fate of her body and has made numerous TV appearances on Nancy Grace and various other shows in relation to this. Perper revealed his findings that Smith's death was due to an accidental lethal combination of therapeutic levels of 3 benzodiazepines and chloral hydrate. Chloral hydrate was believed to be the major contributing factor. An infection in her left buttock was also a contributory factor. After reviewing evidence in collaboration with legal authorities, he judged the death "accidental" and not suicide or homicide, or death by natural causes.

Retirement
In September 2011, Governor Rick Scott announced he would not reappoint Perper to another three-year term as Chief Medical Examiner. Perper expressed surprise at the decision, and subsequently announced his intention to resign at the end of October of that year, and enter retirement.

He died on July 12, 2021.

See also
 Microscopic Diagnosis in Forensic Pathology 
 When to...CALL THE DOCTOR! Your A–Z Guide to Illness, Injury and Today's Medicine 
 Self-assessment of current knowledge in forensic pathology and legal medicine: 1,100 multiple choice questions and referenced answers

References

 
  
 

1932 births
2021 deaths
Medical examiners
People from Bacău
Romanian emigrants to the United States
American people of Romanian-Jewish descent
American coroners
People from Allegheny County, Pennsylvania
People from Broward County, Florida